The St. John's Red Storm football (formerly the St. John's Redmen) program was the intercollegiate American football team for St. John's University located in New York City, New York. The team competed in the NCAA Division I-AA and were members of the Northeast Conference. The school's first football team was fielded in 1884. St. John's participated in football from 1884 to 2002, compiling an all-time record of 238–192–11.

History

Classifications
 1965–1977: N/A
 1978–1992: NCAA Division III
 1993–2002: NCAA Division I–AA

Conference memberships
 1884: Independent
 1885−1917: 
 1918: Independent
 1919−1922: 
 1923−1931: Metropolitan Conference
 1932−1964: 
 1965−1977: Independent
 1978: Division III Independent
 1979−1984: Met-Intercollegiate Conference
 1985−1992: Liberty Football Conference
 1993−1997: Metro Atlantic Athletic Conference
 1998−1999: Division I-AA Independent
 2000−2002: Northeast Conference

Seasons

Notable former players
Notable alumni include:
 Bob Sheppard: Quarterback, Later PA announcer for the New York Yankees

Championships

Conference championships

References

 
1884 establishments in New York (state)
2002 disestablishments in New York (state)
American football teams established in 1884
American football teams disestablished in 2002